Ratched is an American psychological thriller streaming television series created by Evan Romansky, developed by Ryan Murphy and starring Sarah Paulson in the title role of Nurse Mildred Ratched. A prequel to Miloš Forman's 1975 film One Flew Over the Cuckoo's Nest (based on Ken Kesey's 1962 novel of the same title), it depicts the life of Mildred Ratched prior to the events portrayed in the film, albeit in a different state (California as opposed to Oregon). Ratched received a two-season series order. The first season premiered on Netflix on September 18, 2020.

Premise

Cast and characters

Main
 Sarah Paulson as Nurse Mildred Ratched, a nurse who is hired by Dr. Hanover to work at Lucia State Hospital, but her motive to work there is to break her foster brother Edmund out of the hospital after he is admitted there for killing several priests.
 Finn Wittrock as Edmund Tolleson, the murderous and mentally unstable foster brother of Ratched, an inmate at Lucia State Hospital.
 Cynthia Nixon as Gwendolyn Briggs, Governor Willburn's press secretary and campaign manager, and Ratched's love interest.
 Jon Jon Briones as Dr. Richard Hanover/Dr. Manuel Bañaga, the director of Lucia State Hospital who hires Ratched. (season 1)
 Charlie Carver as Huck Finnigan, an orderly at Lucia State Hospital, his face badly disfigured from a war injury. He later gets promoted to head nurse after Betsy takes over the hospital from Dr. Hanover. (season 1)
 Judy Davis as Nurse Betsy Bucket, the head nurse at Lucia State Hospital and a rival of Ratched. She later takes over the hospital from Dr. Hanover after he goes on the run from the police for his past crimes.
 Sharon Stone as Lenore Osgood, a wealthy heiress who hires a hit man to kill Dr. Hanover for disfiguring her son after she hired him to treat her son's mental illness. (season 1)

Recurring

 Corey Stoll as Charles Wainwright, a private investigator and hit man who accepts a contract on Dr. Hanover from Lenore Osgood
 Vincent D'Onofrio as Governor George Willburn, the governor of California
 Alice Englert as Nurse Dolly, a nurse trainee with undiagnosed nymphomania at Lucia State, and Edmund's love interest
 Amanda Plummer as Louise, the owner of the motel that Ratched and Wainwright stay at and longtime friend to Nurse Bucket
 Jermaine Williams as Harold, a security guard at Lucia State
 Annie Starke as Lily Cartwright, a patient at Lucia State who is being treated for her lesbianism
 Brandon Flynn as Henry Osgood, Lenore's psychopathic killer-turned-amputee son who was disfigured by Dr. Hanover when he was his patient
 Michael Benjamin Washington as Trevor Briggs, Gwendolyn's husband with whom she is in a lavender marriage
 Sophie Okonedo as Charlotte Wells, a patient at Lucia State with dissociative identity disorder

Guest
 Hunter Parrish as Father Andrews
 Robert Curtis Brown as Monsignor Sullivan
 David Wells as Father Murphy
 Emily Mest as Nurse Amelia Emerson
 Daniel Di Tomasso as Dario Salvatore
 Harriet Sansom Harris as Ingrid Blix, an opera singer who is lobotomized
 Liz Femi as Leona
 Joseph Marcell as Len Bronley
 Ben Crowley as Reggie Hampson
 Rosanna Arquette as Anna, Ratched and Edmund's former case worker in the foster care system
 Kerry Knuppe as Doris Mayfair
 Benjamin Rigby as Case Hitchen
 Teo Briones as Peter, a boy who is lobotomized by Dr. Hanover to cure daydreaming

Episodes

Season 1 (2020)

Production

Development
On September 6, 2017, it was announced that Netflix had given the production a series order for two seasons.  Netflix reportedly won a bidding war over Hulu and Apple who also were interested in developing the project.  The series was created by Evan Romansky who also wrote the pilot.  His script was eventually received by television producer Ryan Murphy, who then spent a year securing the rights to the Nurse Ratched character and the participation of the Saul Zaentz estate and Michael Douglas, who owned the screen rights to One Flew Over The Cuckoo's Nest. Murphy directed the pilot and executive produced alongside Douglas, Aleen Keshishian, Margaret Riley and Jacob Epstein.  Production companies involved in the series included Fox 21 Television Studios, The Saul Zaentz Company, and Ryan Murphy Productions. Mac Quayle, who has frequently collaborated with Murphy, composed the series' score which heavily borrows from Bernard Herrmann's classic score.

Casting
Alongside the initial series order announcement, it was confirmed that Sarah Paulson had been cast in the lead role of Nurse Ratched. On December 11, 2018, it was reported that Finn Wittrock and Jon Jon Briones had joined the cast of the series. On January 14, 2019, it was announced that Charlie Carver, Judy Davis, Harriet Harris, Cynthia Nixon, Hunter Parrish, Amanda Plummer, Corey Stoll, and Sharon Stone had been cast in the series. In February 2019, it was reported that Rosanna Arquette, Vincent D'Onofrio, Don Cheadle, Alice Englert, Annie Starke, and Stan Van Winkle had been cast in recurring roles. On July 29, 2020, it was reported that Sophie Okonedo, Liz Femi, and Brandon Flynn were cast in recurring roles.

Filming
Filming for the first season took place in early 2019 in Los Angeles and 20th Century Fox Studios. One of the filming locations was the historic Adamson House in Malibu.

Release
The series premiered on September 18, 2020.

Reception

Audience viewership
In its first week of release, Ratched was ranked number one in the Nielsen ratings, who announced that the show had been viewed for a total of 972 million minutes. According to Netflix, the series was viewed by 48 million people in its first four weeks.

Critical response
For the first season, review aggregator Rotten Tomatoes collected 96 critic reviews and identified 61% of them as positive, with an average rating of 6.3/10. The website's critics consensus states, "Ratched is undeniably stylish, but salacious plot holes and cartoonish characterizations undermine its gorgeous production and committed performances." Metacritic assigned the season a weighted average score of 50 out of 100 based on 32 critics, indicating "mixed or average reviews".

In a 5/5 stars review, Nicholas Barber from BBC Online wrote, "Ratched ratchets up everything, from the deeply colourful design to the Bernard Herrmann-like music to noir-ish soap-opera plotting that drips with sex and violence. But it isn't pure camp. Romansky's superb scripts keep tight control of the characters and their intertwining stories, and there are some chillingly accurate depictions of brutal 1940s psychiatric treatment. Ratched is also oddly big-hearted for such a gruesome series. The characters are a crowd of villains, with next to no one who could be classed as heroic, but they are all vulnerable, and most of them are motivated by love – even if that love inspires them to hire a hitman to decapitate an old enemy." The Independents Alexandra Pollard, who rated it 4/5, found the origin story to be "thoughtful and beguiling".

Darren Franich of Entertainment Weekly gave the series a C− and described the series' clothes as "nice, but they're dressing a corpse." Reviewing the series for The Hollywood Reporter, Inkoo Kang wrote that, "The performances are across-the-board fantastic, but Nixon—playing Ratched's love interest—exhibits such frailty, sensuality and decency that her turn ultimately ends up feeling like it belongs in a much better production." TVLine wrote that the series "might be [Ryan Murphy's] emptiest effort yet", giving it a D.

Accolades

References

External links
 
 

2020 American television series debuts
2020s American drama television series
American prequel television series
2020s American LGBT-related drama television series
Dissociative identity disorder in television
English-language Netflix original programming
Lesbian-related television shows
Psychological thriller television series
Psychological thriller web series
Television series by 20th Century Fox Television
Television series by Touchstone Television
Television series created by Ryan Murphy (writer)
Television series set in 1947
Television shows based on American novels
Television shows filmed in Los Angeles
Television shows set in California
Works about nursing
Works set in psychiatric hospitals
Television about mental health
Mass murder in fiction
Matricide in fiction
Murder in television
Suicide in television